Florida sand pine scrub is an endangered subtropical forest ecoregion found throughout Florida in the United States. It is found on coastal and inland sand ridges and is characterized by an evergreen xeromorphic plant community dominated by shrubs and dwarf oaks. Because the low-nutrient sandy soils do not retain moisture, the ecosystem is effectively an arid one. Wildfires infrequently occur in the Florida scrub. Most of the annual rainfall (about ) falls in summer. It is endangered by residential, commercial and agricultural development, with the largest remaining block in and around the Ocala National Forest.

Plant communities
There is a high level of endemism in the flora and fauna, including an estimated 40 species of plants, 4 vertebrates and at least 46 species of arthropod found nowhere else.

Florida peninsula inland scrub
Florida peninsula inland scrub is the plant community for which this ecoregion is named. Clumps of sand pines (Pinus clausa) constitute the canopy. Common plant species include sand live oak (Quercus geminata), myrtle oak (Q. myrtifolia), sandhill oak (Q. inopina), Chapman oak (Q. chapmanii), Florida rosemary (Ceratiola ericoides), scrub palmetto (Sabal etonia), saw palmetto (Serenoa repens), garberia (Garberia heterophylla), fetterbush lyonia (Lyonia lucida), rusty staggerbush (L. ferruginea), cup lichens (Cladonia spp.), scrub holly (Ilex opaca var. arenicola), American olive (Osmanthus americanus var. megacarpus), flag-pawpaw (Asimina obovata), silk bay (Persea humilis), Adam's needle (Yucca filamentosa), and eastern prickly pear (Opuntia humifusa).

Longleaf pine sandhill
Florida longleaf pine sandhills are often found adjacent to the scrub. They consist of stands of longleaf pine (Pinus palustris) on very well-drained, sandy hills. These stands are maintained by frequent fires. Turkey oak (Quercus laevis) is common in the understory and pineland threeawn (Aristida stricta) makes up the ground layer.

Oak dome and hammock
The southern coastal plain oak dome and hammocks occur as thick stands of evergreen oaks in small patches on shallow depressions or slight hills. These forests are distinct from their surrounding habitats, which are often dominated by longleaf pine. On mesic sites, common species are southern live oak (Quercus virginiana), sand laurel oak (Q. hemisphaerica), and American persimmon (Diospyros virginiana). The understory is sparse, with trumpet creeper (Campsis radicans) and greenbriers (Smilax spp). On xeric sites, common species are sand live oak (Quercus geminata), southern live oak (Q. virginiana), longleaf pine (Pinus palustris), pineland threeawn (Aristida stricta), and southern dawnflower (Stylisma humistrata).

Highlands freshwater marsh
Floridian highlands freshwater marshes are highland marshes found in shallow peat-filled valleys, the basins of dried lakes, and the borders of existing lakes. The vegetation mosaic includes a range of mostly herbaceous plant communities, varying based on water depth. Deep water supports various submerged and floating plants. Meter-deep water supports emergent herbaceous perennial plants, typically in dense, monospecific stands, such as bulrush (Typha latifolia), pickerelweed (Pontederia cordata), and American lotus (Nelumbo lutea). Shallow areas submerged only during the wet season support more grasses, including maidencane (Panicum hemitomon) and southern cutgrass (Leersia hexandra). Subsidence and drainage pattern changes make these habitats shift and change over time. Soils can be mucky, loamy, or sandy, but they are generally above permeable subsoils that create standing water much of the year. These marshes may also be called meadows or prairies.

Nonriverine basin swamp
Southern coastal plain nonriverine basin swamps occur in large, seasonally-flooded depressions away from rivers. Sites are often forested in trees such as bald cypress (Taxodium distichum), swamp tupelo (Nyssa biflora), and sometimes slash pine (Pinus elliottii). Characteristic shrubs include buckwheat tree (Cliftonia monophylla), swamp cyrilla (Cyrilla racemiflora), laurelleaf greenbrier (Smilax laurifolia), and fetterbush lyonia (Lyonia lucida).

Animals
Notable animals of the Florida scrub include the Florida scrub jay (Aphelocoma coerulescens), the endemic Florida mouse (Podomys floridanus), sand skink (Neoseps reynoldsi), bluetail mole skink (Plestiodon egregius lividus), Florida scrub lizard (Sceloporus woodi), Florida worm lizard (Rhineura floridana), and the gopher tortoise which is an important keystone species.

See also
 List of ecoregions in the United States (WWF)

Notes

External links

External links
 Archbold Station.org: An introduction to Florida scrub

Temperate coniferous forests of the United States
Ecoregions of Florida
Forests of Florida

Nearctic ecoregions